The Prime of Miss Jean Brodie is a 1969 British drama film directed by Ronald Neame from a screenplay written by Jay Presson Allen, adapted from her own stage play, which was in turn based on the 1961 novel of the same name by Muriel Spark. The film stars Maggie Smith in the title role as an unrestrained teacher at a girls' school in Edinburgh. Celia Johnson, Robert Stephens, Pamela Franklin, and Gordon Jackson are featured in supporting roles.

The Prime of Miss Jean Brodie premiered at the 1969 Cannes Film Festival, where it competed for the Palme d'Or and was released in cinemas in the UK on 24 February 1969 and in the US on 2 March 1969. The film received positive reviews with major acclaim drawn towards Smith's performance, although it was a box office disappointment, grossing $3 million on a $2.76 million budget. 

At the 42nd Academy Awards, Smith won the Academy Award for Best Actress for her performance, and the film was also nominated for Best Original Song for its theme song "Jean."

Plot
Jean Brodie is a teacher at an all-girls school in Edinburgh, Scotland, in the 1930s. Brodie is known for her tendency to stray from the school's curriculum, to romanticize fascist leaders like Benito Mussolini and Francisco Franco, and to believe herself to be in the prime of life. Brodie devotes her energy and attention to girls she sees as special or moldable, who are referred to as the "Brodie Set". At the film's outset, the Brodie Set is composed of four 12-year-old junior school girls: Sandy, Monica, Jenny, and Mary.

The Brodie Set often go to art museums, theatre, and have picnics on the school lawn, to the chagrin of the school's austere headmistress Emmeline Mackay, who dislikes that the girls are cultured to the exclusion of hard knowledge, and seem precocious for their age. She has a grudge against Brodie, who has tenure and was hired six years before Mackay became headmistress. Brodie boasts to her girls that the only way she will stop teaching is if she is assassinated.

Brodie catches the eye of the school's music teacher and choirmaster Gordon Lowther, with whom she and the girls spend weekends at his luxurious home in Cramond. Brodie sometimes spends the night with Lowther, although she tries to conceal this from the girls. Lowther wishes to marry Brodie, but she still has feelings for the school's art teacher Teddy Lloyd, an ex-lover of Brodie's who steadily pursues her.

As the Brodie Set grow older and progress to the Senior School, they frequent Teddy Lloyd's studio, where he paints Jenny's portrait. Sandy initially rebuffs a lecherous advance from Lloyd. However, when Brodie tries to manoeuvre Jenny and Lloyd into an affair, and Sandy into spying on them, it is Sandy, resentful of Brodie's constant praise of Jenny's beauty, who becomes Teddy's lover and muse. Sandy ends the affair because of Lloyd's continuing obsession with Brodie.

Mary, influenced by Brodie, leaves the school to join her brother, whom she believes to be fighting for Franco. She is killed shortly after crossing the frontier, which incites Sandy to inform the headmistress of Brodie's efforts to impose her politics on her students. The disclosure finally leads to Brodie's termination, her humiliation compounded by Mr. Lowther's engagement to another teacher.

Before Brodie's departure, Sandy confronts her about her manipulation of Mary, Mary's senseless death, and the harmful influence she exerted on other girls, adding that Mary's brother is actually fighting for the Spanish Republicans. Brodie responds with a series of harsh but astute comments about Sandy's character, particularly her ability to coldly judge and destroy others. Sandy retorts that Brodie professed to be an admirer of conquerors and walks out of the classroom, as Brodie screams, "Assassin!"

Sandy, Monica, and Jenny graduate and leave the school. As Sandy departs, her face streaked with tears, Brodie's voice is heard proclaiming her oft-repeated motto: "Little girls, I am in the business of putting old heads on young shoulders, and all my pupils are the crème de la crème. Give me a girl at an impressionable age, and she is mine for life."

Cast

 Maggie Smith as Jean Brodie 
 Robert Stephens as Teddy Lloyd
 Pamela Franklin as Sandy
 Gordon Jackson as Gordon Lowther
 Jane Carr as Mary McGregor
 Shirley Steedman as Monica
 Diane Grayson as Jenny
 Celia Johnson as Miss Mackay
 Margo Cunningham as Miss Campbell
 Isla Cameron as Miss McKenzie
 Molly Weir as Miss Allison Kerr
 Helena Gloag as Miss Ellen Kerr
 Rona Anderson as Miss Lockhart
 Ann Way as Miss Gaunt

The cast included two pairs of married actors: Maggie Smith and Robert Stephens, and Gordon Jackson and Rona Anderson. Julie Andrews was initially offered the role of Jean Brodie.

Relationship to novel and play
There is a complex relationship between the novel, the play and the film.

Allen created a successful play out of a challenging short novel. Vanessa Redgrave triumphed in the lead role in London, as did Zoe Caldwell in New York. Vincent Canby, reviewing the film in the New York Times, said, "Jay Presson Allen . . . created a much better play than is generally recognized. Roles like that of Miss Jean Brodie don't often write themselves" (3 March 1969). However, some critics have questioned whether the play is a particularly faithful adaptation. They have suggested that it turned an experimental work into a realistic one and removed some theological issues, turning the final product into a story of failed love (and possibly also failed fascist politics).

The play reduced the number of girls in the Brodie Set from six to four (and discarded another girl not in the set) and some of them are composites of girls in the novel. Mary is a composite of the original Mary and Joyce Emily; although mainly based on the original Mary, in the novel it was Joyce Emily who died in the Spanish Civil War (Mary later dies in a fire instead), and rather more is made of this incident in the play than in the novel. Jenny is a composite of the original Jenny and Rose; in spite of her name she has more in common with Rose who, in the novel, Miss Brodie tried to manoeuvre into having an affair with Mr Lloyd.

The novel made extensive use of flash forward. The play largely dropped this device, although it did include a few scenes showing Sandy as a nun in later life. The film, which made a few changes from the play, discarded these scenes in favour of an entirely linear narrative.

Reception

Box office
According to Fox records the film required $5,400,000 in rentals to break even and by 11 December 1970 had made $6,650,000. In September 1970 the studio reported it had made a profit of $831,000 on the film.

Critical response
Upon its initial release, the film received positive feedback from critics. Review aggregate website Rotten Tomatoes reports that 84% of 19 critics have given the film a positive review, with a rating average of 7.15 out of 10.

Maggie Smith was singled out for her performance in the film. Dave Kehr of Chicago Reader said that Smith gives "one of those technically stunning, emotionally distant performances that the British are so damn good at." Greg Ferrara wrote that the film "is one of the best British films of the decade. It is as captivating today as it was upon its release and its two central performances by Maggie Smith and Pamela Franklin are both stirring and mesmerizing. The Prime of Miss Jean Brodie is the crème de la crème."

Accolades

1978 television version
The Prime of Miss Jean Brodie was adapted by Scottish Television into a seven episode television serial for ITV in 1978 that featured Geraldine McEwan in the lead role. Rather than recapitulate the plot of the novel, the series imagined episodes in the lives of the characters, such as conflict between Jean Brodie and the father of an Italian refugee student, who fled Mussolini's Italy because the father was persecuted as a journalist who objected to fascism.  It consisted of seven episodes of 50 minutes. It was released on DVD in Region 1 and 2.

References

External links
 
 
 
 

1969 films
1969 drama films
1960s coming-of-age drama films
1960s English-language films
20th Century Fox films
Films set in schools
British coming-of-age drama films
British films based on plays
Films about educators
Films about fascism
Films based on adaptations
Films based on British novels
Films directed by Ronald Neame
Films featuring a Best Actress Academy Award-winning performance
Films scored by Rod McKuen
Films set in Edinburgh
Films set in the 1930s
Films shot at Pinewood Studios
Films shot in Edinburgh
1960s British films